Back to the Woods is a 1937 short subject directed by Preston Black starring American slapstick comedy team The Three Stooges (Moe Howard, Larry Fine and Curly Howard). It is the 23rd entry in the series released by Columbia Pictures starring the comedians, who released 190 shorts for the studio between 1934 and 1959.

Plot
Set in colonial times, the Stooges are convicted criminals who are banished from England to the American colonies. When they arrive (and after a dancing fling with the governor’s daughters), they find that the colonists are starving because the local Indians will not let them use their hunting grounds without a fee of 5,000 shekels. A down payment has been made, but it is not enough. The Stooges decide to go hunting anyway to help out the colony.

Outside of Plymouth, they exchange their pilgrim hats with coonskin caps, except Curly, who wears a skunk hat. An accidental discharge by Curly’s blunderbuss yields a turkey, which gives them hope. Then, they spot what they think are a group of turkeys and fire their rather overcharged long blunderbusses at the group. The “group” turn out to be Indian headdresses, and the fired-upon Indians become agitated. Attempts at retaliatory fire fail as their guns are destroyed by the powder overcharge, and they are chased by the Indians.

A wild goose chase ensues. The Stooges use a tree branch catapult to launch a rock, a mudpack, a fish, a hornet’s nest, and then a log at their antagonists. But in their escape, Larry is left behind, captured and tied to a tree, ready to be scalped. A passing woodpecker adds to his misery. Curly and Moe eventually rescue him, helped with dumping hot coals down the Indian’s pants and wapping them on their behinds sending them howling and running for the lake. The Stooges escape in a canoe, “motorboat” style, having accidentally revived the bopped Indians with water.

Production notes
Back to the Woods  is the last Stooges' films directed by "Preston Black", pseudonym of Jules White's older brother and fellow producer/director Jack White. It is the second-longest Stooge short filmed, running at 19' 27"; the longest is A Pain in the Pullman, clocking in at 19' 46". Filming was completed on March 2–6, 1937.

Near the beginning of Back to the Woods when the Stooges are prisoners, each Stooge drops the metal ball that is being used to restrain him, in succession. When each ball hits the ground, a chime rings. The notes are the G-E-C chime sequence that was (and still is) the same as the NBC Chimes used for NBC radio and later NBC television. This is followed by Curly imitating a radio announcer. The "NBC chimes" gag would eventually be recycled in the team's 1941 short So Long Mr. Chumps.

Larry refers to the WPA, which he identifies as the "Willing Pilgrims Association". This is a reference to the Works Progress Administration, a New Deal program that was prominent in the 1930s.

Curly and Larry refer to Whopper and Rosemont, two popular racehorses of the era.

The shot of the Stooges leaving in their high speed canoe was recycled from Whoops, I'm an Indian!. Back to the Woods was the first Stooge film to employ stock footage, a practice that would become more common in future productions.

References

External links 
 
 
 Back to the Woods at threestooges.net

1937 films
Columbia Pictures short films
The Three Stooges films
American black-and-white films
1937 comedy films
American slapstick comedy films
Films about Native Americans
1930s English-language films
1930s American films